Melpuram is a historical place in Kanyakumari district, Tamil Nadu, India.

Rubber plantation plays an important role in this village's economy.

Melpuram is a quasi town that is sandwiched by Pacode town panchayat and Edaicode panchayat also the Melpuram union block name is derived from this small town which incorporates 10 village panchayats and 6 town panchayats. Christians and Hindus are the inhabitants of the Melpuram which is proudly saying that there is no communal violence seen.

History

Melpuram had been  also a part of the Travancore Kingdom till India got freedom from the British. After India emerging as country, the small town was an enclave of the state of Kerala. The efforts being taken by the Kanyakumari district leaders such as Marshel Nesamony, Ponnapan Nadar and Chithamparanathan Nadar, etc. who fought against to the state of Kerala in order to join with Tamil Nadu had made ease Melpuram to be the part of Tamil Nadu.

Landmarks
Churches and Temples are the landmarks of Melpuram. The Assemblies of God Church (AG) is one of the oldest AG churches in India, It was established in the year 1922 by missionaries. The year 2022 marked the centennial celebration completing 100 years in service. People worship Hindu village temples and Kudumpa Deva, devi swamis like Nagar Kavoo, Essakki Amman temples, Ayya Vaikundar Nilal Thangals with age-old temples (Madathu vilagam Essakki Amman temple Perai, Kaisala vilai Esakki Amman, Kalpadagu Amman) and churches, it is a place for communal harmony. The Oldest Church near melpuram is Immanuel Lutheran Church Melpuram (near Aluvilai) established by American Missionaries on the lights of Rev. Sheltor and Rev. Koepke in 1947 August 15, India Elim Deva Sabai, which is called Elim church (near block office) established by Rev. K. M. Mathew in 1947, Sree Navaneetha Krishna Temple  and the Sree Eeshwara Kaala Bhoothathaan Temple.

Economy

The rubber industry and cashewnut industry is a main income source of the people of melpuram. The extinct of the paddy fields and banana planting is a chaos for future generation. The agriculture of tapioca (Marichini kilangu) and palm tree are also diminishing sectors in the areas of Melpuram which was once considered as part of livelihood. The income from the coconut trees are not relied on since the booming of rubber has been welcomed.

References

Villages in Kanyakumari district